Andrew Baxter ( 1686–1750) was a Scottish metaphysicist.

Andrew Baxter may also refer to:

Andrew Baxter (musician) (1869–1955), African-American fiddle player
Andrew Baxter on List of Fellows of the Engineering Institute of Canada
Dr. Andrew Baxter, character in The Young Doctors

See also
Robert Andrew Baxter (1879–1947), Canadian politician